This is the complete list of (physical) number-one albums sold in Finland in 2008 according to Finland's Official List composed by Suomen Ääni- ja kuvatallennetuottajat ÄKT (since late August 2010, known as Musiikkituottajat – IFPI Finland).

Chart history

See also
List of number-one singles of 2008 (Finland)

References

Number-one albums
Finland
2008